The Sun, My Father is a 1991 poetry collection by Finnish Sami author Nils-Aslak Valkeapää. It won the Nordic Council's Literature Prize in 1991.

References

1991 books
Sámi poetry
Nordic Council's Literature Prize-winning works